The Finnish men's national under 20 ice hockey team is the national under-20 ice hockey team in Finland. The team represents Finland at the International Ice Hockey Federation's IIHF World U20 Championship.

WJC 2021 roster
Roster for the 2021 World Junior Championships:

World Junior Championship record

† Includes one win in extra time (in the preliminary round)
^ Includes one loss in extra time (in the preliminary round)
* Includes one win in extra time (in the playoff round)
+ Includes one loss in extra time (in the playoff round)

Head coaches (WJC) 

1977-78 Matti Väisänen
1979 Matti Reunamäki
1980-81 Olli Hietanen
1982 Alpo Suhonen
1983 Juhani Wahlsten
1984-85 Pentti Matikainen
1986-88 Hannu Jortikka
1989 Erkka Westerlund
1990 Hannu Jortikka
1991 Samu Kuitunen
1992-93 Jarmo Tolvanen
1994 Esko Nokelainen
1995-96 Harri Rindell
1997 Hannu Jortikka
1998 Hannu Kapanen
1999 Jukka Rautakorpi
2000 Hannu Kapanen
2001 Kari Jalonen
2002-03 Erkka Westerlund

2004 Hannu Aravirta
2005 Risto Dufva
2006 Hannu Aravirta
2007 Jarmo Tolvanen
2008-09 Jukka Rautakorpi
2010 Hannu Jortikka
2011 Lauri Marjamäki
2012 Raimo Helminen
2013 Harri Rindell
2014 Karri Kivi
2015 Hannu Jortikka
2016 Jukka Jalonen
2017 Jukka Rautakorpi/Jussi Ahokas
2018-19 Jussi Ahokas
2020 Raimo Helminen
2021-22 Antti Pennanen
2023- Tomi Lämsä

References

External links 
 QuantHockey - Team Finland U20 all-time statistical leaders

Jun
Junior national ice hockey teams